The 1995 Qatari coup d'état was a bloodless palace coup that took place in Qatar on 27 June 1995. The coup was carried out by then Crown Prince Hamad bin Khalifa Al Thani who, with the support of the ruling Al Thani family, took control of the country while his father, Emir Khalifa bin Hamad Al Thani, was on a visit to Geneva, Switzerland. The coup came after a falling out between Hamad bin Khalifa and his father who, in early 1995, had tried regaining some of the authority he bestowed upon Hamad since 1992.

Aftermath
In response to the coup, Khalifa bin Hamad called his son an "ignorant man" and proclaimed that he was still the legitimate ruler, while Hamad bin Khalifa engaged an American law firm to freeze his father's bank accounts abroad in order to deter a possible counter-coup. However, a counter-coup was attempted in February 1996 under the leadership of former Economy Minister Hamad bin Jassim bin Hamad Al Thani. The counter-coup failed, and several of Qatar's traditional Arab allies were implicated in the plot, namely Saudi Arabia, the United Arab Emirates, Bahrain and Egypt.

After his deposition, the former Emir lived in exile in France and Abu Dhabi, United Arab Emirates, until he returned to Qatar in 2004.

See also
 1972 Qatari coup d'état
 1996 Qatari coup d'état attempt

References

Conflicts in 1995
Coup d'etat, 1995
coup d'etat
Qatar
Military history of Qatar
Military coups in Qatar
June 1995 events in Asia